This is a partial list of Australian spiders and harvestmen 
(Orders Araneae and Opiliones).

Order Araneae

Family Actinopodidae
Missulena spp. Mouse spiders
Family Araneidae
Arachnura higginsii, Scorpion-tailed spider
Argiope keyserlingi, St Andrew's cross spider 
Argiope protensa, Tear drop spider or longtailed orb-weaving spider
Argiope trifasciata, Banded orb-weaving spider 
Austracantha minax, Christmas Jewel Spider
Celaenia excavata, Bird-dropping spider
Cyrtophora spp., Tent spiders 
Eriophora pustulosa, Garden orbweb spider 
Eriophora transmarina, Wheelweaving orbweaving spider 
Ordgarius magnificus, Magnificent spider
Plebs bradleyi, Enamelled spider 
Poecilopachys australasia, Two-spined spider
Family Austrochilidae
Hickmania troglodytes, Tasmanian cave spider
Family Barychelidae
Idioctis spp., Intertidal trapdoor spider
Idiommata spp., Brushfooted trapdoor spider
Seqocrypta jakara, Brush footed spider
Family Clubionidae
Clubiona robusta, Stout sac spider
Family Corinnidae
Poecilipta spp., Ant-mimicking spiders
Nyssus coloripes, Painted swift spider
Family Deinopidae
Deinopis subrufa, Common netcasting spider
Family Desidae

Badumna insignis, Black house spider
Badumna longinqua, Brown house spider
Family Dipluridae
Troglodiplura lowryi, Nullarbor cave trapdoor spider
Family Dysderidae
Dysdera crocota, European garden spider
Family Gnaphosidae
Anzacia gemmea, Silvery vagabond spider
Hemicloea rogenhoferi, Flattened bark spider
Family Hersiliidae
Tamopsis spp., Two-tailed spiders 
Family Hexathelidae
Atrax robustus, Sydney funnel-web spider
Hadronyche spp. Funnel-web spiders
Plesiothele fentoni, Lake Fenton trapdoor spider 
Family Idiopidae
Aganippe spp. Trapdoor spiders
Arbanitis spp., Golden trapdoor spider
Blakistonia aurea, Adelaide trapdoor spider
Idiosoma nigrum, Shieldbacked trapdoor spider
Misgolas rapax, Sydney brown trapdoor spider
Misgolas robertsi, Tube spider
Family Lamponidae
Lampona cylindrata, Whitetailed spider
Lampona murina, Whitetailed spider
Family Lycosidae
Venatrix furcillata, Little striped wolf spider
Tasmanicosa godeffroyi, Garden wolf spider
Family Mimetidae
Australomimetus spp., Pirate spiders
Family Miturgidae
Miturga spp., Lined spiders
Family Nemesiidae
Aname diversicolor, Black wishbone spider
Stanwellia grisea, Melbourne trapdoor spider
Family Nicodamidae
Nicodamus spp., Red-and-black spiders
Family Oecobiidae
Oecobius navus, Wall spider
Family Pholcidae
Pholcus phalangioides, Daddy long-legs spider
Family Pisauridae
Megadolomedes australianus, Giant water spider
Family Salticidae
Helpis minitabunda, Bronze Aussie jumper 
Maratus spp. Peacock Spiders 
Mopsus mormon, Northern Green Jumping spider
Myrmarachne spp., Ant-mimicking spider
Sandalodes spp. Large Jumping Spiders
Family Scytodidae
Scytodes thoracica, Common Spitting spider
Family Sparassidae
Delena cancerides, Flat Huntsman spider, Social Huntsman Spider or Avondale spider
Holconia immanis, Sydney Huntsman spider, Large Huntsman spider, Giant Huntsman spider, Grey Huntsman Spider 
Neosparassus spp., Badge Huntsman spiders and Shield Huntsman spiders 
Pandercetes gracilis, Lichen huntsman
Family Stiphidiidae
Stiphidion facetum, Sombrero spider
Family Tetragnathidae
Phonognatha graeffei, Leaf curling spider
Tetragnatha spp., Four-jawed spider
Family Theraphosidae
Selenocosmia crassipes, Coastal Whistling spider
Selenocosmia stirlingi, Australian Common Whistling spider
Selenotypus plumipes, Australian Featherleg spider
Family Theridiidae

Ariamnes spp., Whip spiders
Latrodectus hasselti, Redback spider
Nesticodes rufipes, Red-legged House spider
Steatoda grossa, Cupboard spider
Thwaitesia argentiopunctata, Silver Dewdrop spider
Family Thomisidae
Amyciaea albomaculata, Green Tree Ant Mimicking spider
Australomisidia spp. Australian Crab Spiders
Hedana spp., Green Crab spider
Stephanopis altifrons, Knobbly Crab spider
Thomisus spectabilis, Australian Crab Spider
Zygometis xanthogaster Yellow-tailed Crab Spider
Family Uloboridae
Zosis geniculata, White-kneed spider

Order Opiliones
Family Gagrellidae
Nelima doriae, introduced daddy-longlegs
Family Phalangiidae
Spinicrus spp., Harvestmen 
Family Triaenychidae
Equitius spp., Harvestmen 
Hickmanoxyomma spp., Cave harvestman
Triaenobunus spp., Harvestmen

See also 
 Spider attacks in Australia

References 

Spiders
Australian spiders

Australia
Spiders of Australia